The 2006 Rally of Turkey was the thirteenth round of the 2006 World Rally Championship season. It took place between October 15–17, 2006. It was the last WRC event that the late Colin McRae competed in. He retired on the final stage with a mechanical problem.

Results

Special stages
All dates and times are EEST (UTC+3).

External links
 Results at eWRC.com
 Results at Jonkka's World Rally Archive

Rally Of Turkey
Turkey
Rally of Turkey
October 2006 sports events in Turkey